The MG5 is a series of compact cars that has been produced by SAIC Motor under the MG marque since 2012. The first generation MG 5 was launched on 28 March 2012 in China, and shares the same automotive platform as the Roewe 350 saloon car. 

In China, the first generation hatchback was sold as the MG5, while the sedan was sold as the MG GT. The first-generation MG GT was also sold as the MG 5 in several markets.

The second-generation model is marketed as the MG5 in China and Thailand, and either the MG5 GT or MG GT elsewhere. For most markets outside China and Thailand, the MG5 nameplate is used for a different model, which is the export version of the Roewe i5. Its battery electric version, the Roewe Ei5 is exported to Europe as the MG5 EV.


First generation (AP12; 2012) 

The first generation MG5 debuted in concept car form at the 2011 Shanghai Auto Show as the MG Concept 5.

Outside of China, this first generation was exported to various emerging markets such as Egypt, Chile and Algeria.

Technical details

There is a choice of five speed manual or four speed automatic transmissions. 

All models are equipped with 16 inch wheels, fitted with 205/55 tyres.

Second generation (2020)

The second generation MG5 debuted in September 2020 right before the 2020 Beijing Auto Show. 

According to SAIC, the second generation MG5 features the third generation MG family design language, including a front fascia similar to the 2020 MG HS facelift, with engine options include a 1.5 litre turbo petrol four cylinder engine developed by SAIC, producing  and a 1.5 litre petrol four cylinder engine producing .

The MG5 was revealed in July 2021 in Thailand, featuring the 1.5-litre SAIC 15S4C engine.

Powertrain

MG5 Scorpio (2022)
The MG 5 received a performance variant called the MG5 Scorpio for the 2022 model year with the front fascia completely redesigned and an additional performance-inspired body kit and additional color options. Gearbox remains to be the same 7-speed DCT.

Other versions

Since 2019, the MG5 nameplate is also used for a rebadged Roewe i5 for markets outside China due to the absence of the Roewe brand outside China. In markets outside Europe, the MG5 nameplate is used for the petrol-powered Roewe i5 saloon, while the original MG5 is marketed as the MG GT or MG5 GT.

In Europe, electric Roewe Ei5 estate was introduced in 2020 as the MG5 EV or MG5 SW EV. The MG5 EV was marketed as the first ever electric estate car in the UK market and was launched alongside the plug-in hybrid version of the HS crossover.

References

External links

5
Cars of China
2010s cars
Front-wheel-drive vehicles
Hatchbacks
Cars introduced in 2012
Vehicles with CVT transmission
Compact cars
Sedans